Brin may refer to:

People
 Benedetto Brin (1833–1898), Italian naval administrator and politician
 David Brin (born 1950), science fiction author
 Irene Brin (1911–1969), Italian fashion journalist, writer and art dealer
 Romeo Brin (born 1973), Filipino retired amateur boxer
 Sergey Brin (born 1973), co-founder of Google

Other uses
 Brin-class submarine, a 1930s Royal Italian Navy class
 Italian submarine Brin, named after Benedetto Brin
 Brin (Genoa Metro), a railway station on the outskirts of Genoa, Italy
 Michael Brin Prize in Dynamical Systems or Brin Prize, a mathematics award
 Block Range Index (BRIN), a database indexing technique
 Brin Londo, the DC Comics superhero Timber Wolf
 River Brin, a small tributary of the River Nairn, Scottish Highlands, United Kingdom
 Brin, a fibroin filament which is a component of silk

See also
 Brin's Oxygen Company (1886–1905), original name of the industrial gas company The BOC Group
 Brin process, a chemical process used to produce oxygen
 Bryn (disambiguation)